A banana connector (commonly banana plug for the male, banana socket or banana jack for the female) is a single-wire (one conductor)  electrical connector used for joining wires to equipment. The term 4 mm connector is also used, especially in Europe, although not all banana connectors will mate with 4 mm parts, and 2 mm banana connectors exist. Various styles of banana plug contacts exist, all based on the concept of spring metal applying outward force into the unsprung cylindrical jack to produce a snug fit with good electrical conductivity. Common types include: a solid pin split lengthwise and splayed slightly, a tip of four leaf springs, a cylinder with a single leaf spring on one side, a bundle of stiff wire, a central pin surrounded by a multiple-slit cylinder with a central bulge, or simple sheet spring metal rolled into a nearly complete cylinder. The plugs are frequently used to terminate patch cords for electronic test equipment such as laboratory power supply units, while sheathed banana plugs are common on multimeter probe leads.

History
Invention of the plug is claimed by two entities. The Hirschmann company claims it was invented by Richard Hirschmann in 1924. A competing claim is made for the General Radio Company, which stated "1924: GenRad developed banana plug - replaces pin plugs, this spring-loaded connector technology ..." and that it was "introduced in this country [the US] by GR in 1924".

In 1929 Richard Hirschmann was granted a patent for an improved banana plug. The patent describes a banana plug that consists of two parts only. Not needing a small screw to hold the wire in place, like in conventional Bananensteckern (banana plugs), is presented as an advantage of the invention.

Design 

This pin length is still common in Europe and other parts of the world. However other sizes have emerged, such as  pins, which can commonly be found in the US.

The pin's diameter is nominally . The pin has one or more lengthwise springs that bulge outwards slightly, giving the appearance of a banana. Taking the springs into account, the actual diameter of a banana plug is typically a bit larger than 4 mm when not plugged in. When inserted into a matching 4 mm socket the springs press against the sides of the socket, improving the electrical contact and preventing the pin from falling out.  The other end of the plug has a lug connector to which a length of flexible insulated equipment wire can be attached, which is either screwed, soldered, or crimped into place.  On banana plugs for laboratory use, an insulating plastic cover is usually fitted over this rear end of the connector, while banana plugs for speaker connections often use uninsulated metal bodies.

The rear end of a 4 mm plug often has a 4 mm hole drilled in it, either transversely or axially, or both, to accept the pin of another 4 mm plug.  This type is called a stackable or stacking plug.

For high voltage use, sheathed versions of the banana plug and socket are used. These add an insulating sheath around both the male and female connectors to avoid accidental contact. The sheathed male plug will not work with an unsheathed female socket, but an unsheathed male plug will fit a sheathed female socket.

Individual banana plugs and jacks are commonly color-coded red and black, but are available in a wide variety of colors. Dual banana plugs are often black with some physical feature such as a molded ridge or thick tab, marked "Gnd" indicating the relative polarity of the two plugs.

Besides plugging into specific banana jacks, banana plugs may plug into "five-way" or "universal" binding posts.

Derived plugs 

The PL-259 plug is widely used as an HF cable connector; it is a shielded form of a 4 mm banana plug.

A number of widely used plugs are based on combining two or more banana plugs in a common plastic housing and other features for ease of use and to prevent accidental insertion in other such plugs. The  inch spacing originated on General Radio test equipment during the 1920s, and their type 274-M dual-plug is a notable example from that era.

The housing may allow the connection of individual wires, a permanently attached coaxial cable providing both signal and ground, or a coaxial connector such as the BNC connector shown in the photo. Conventionally the tab located on one side of the dual banana plug denotes the ground, shell, or negative (reference) side of the connector.

Miniature banana connectors 

Various miniature versions of the banana connector have been introduced. One type is 2.6 mm in diameter and about one third the length of the standard connector, and is commonly used in model railway applications. These are substantially more fragile than the larger connectors. Multiple miniature banana connectors are usually spaced on  inch centers. Another miniature type is the 2 mm banana connector, which is otherwise identical to the 4 mm version, including the various plug contact styles and availability of sheathed versions for high voltage applications.

Pin tip jacks
A closely related but different design is the so-called "pin tip plug" and matching "pin tip jack".  The pin tip plug designs resemble banana plugs, but without the spring on the male pin.  The diameter of the male pin is 2 mm. Instead, these designs rely on spring action in the female jack, or tightly machined tolerances, to ensure good contact.  The pin tip plug design was used where maximum density of connectors was desired (such as in pin plugboards), or a very compact connector was needed.

Wander plug

These superficially similar plugs were widely used in the UK and elsewhere until the 1960s. A significant use was for connecting the separate HT (High Tension, usually 90 Volts) and grid bias batteries in early battery powered valve (tube) radios and for the antenna and earth (ground) connections and external loudspeaker in both mains and battery powered valve radios. The battery terminals were short (approximately 6 mm to 10 mm) bell-mouthed brass tubes of  nominal internal diameter. The wander plug may have gotten its name from its need to "wander about" when setting the correct grid bias voltage(s) for most economical operation of the radio. 

The wander plug was always used in a rigid socket and therefore the pin end was split to allow some elasticity and provide a secure fit in the socket. Often a machined brass component which formed the pin contact (which was split) and the means of connecting the external wire, clamped by means of a screw-on coloured hard plastic cap. Another design used an actual split pin of plated steel, the parallel ends of which formed the plug tip. A machined brass component with an internal bore of just over  inch, a transverse slot to accommodate the eye end of the split pin, and an external screw thread to engage the coloured hard plastic cap, tightening of which trapped the stripped end of the wire in the eye of the split pin to establish a secure connection.

The wander plug may have pre-dated the banana plug, but was virtually obsolete by the 1970s, by which time most of the equipment requiring them was long obsolete.

Wander plugs generally would not inter-mate successfully with banana sockets and attempts to do so by spreading the brass tip often ended with its fracture. The tip of some banana plugs could be forced into some sockets intended for wander plugs, but would invariably be insecure.

Electrical safety 

Quality banana plugs and cables are typically rated for 30 V at 15 A.  Cheaper cables may have one or more downsides: lower quality plugs, smaller diameter wire, lower strand count wire, thinner insulation, lower quality insulation. Unsheathed banana connectors are not usually rated for mains voltage.

One reason why banana connectors are not rated for mains usage is that an exposed banana plug or socket can present a shock hazard if connected to an energized source. A plug that is only partially inserted into a jack can also present a risk of accidental contact, because the conductive surface of the plug will not be completely covered. This can especially happen if a 20 mm long plug is inserted into a socket that is only intended for 15 mm long plugs. Some banana plugs have exposed set screws that are electrically connected to the wire. When stacking plugs using transverse holes in a plug, large parts of the pin of the second plug are exposed.  Another reason why banana connectors are not rated for mains usage is the lack of double insulation of wires and connectors. The hazards include electric shock, electrocution, burns from accidental short circuits, and damage to the attached equipment. 

Where electrical safety is an issue, sheathed plugs and sockets are used. These plugs have fixed or sliding sheaths or other devices to protect the user from accidental contact with live conductors, but are still largely compatible with the original design. When inserted, the sheaths of the plug and socket overlap fully, ensuring that no live metal is exposed. A typical design is now required (IEC 61010) on multimeter test leads and several other measurement and laboratory equipment. In this design, the metal banana plug is entirely sheathed in a plastic tube and inserts into a deeply recessed jack in the multimeter. Alternatively, the equipment may use a deeply recessed male banana plug, while the test lead uses a sheathed banana jack. Additionally, the test lead wire must be made with insulation rated for higher voltages.

For this reason, throughout the European Union, audio amplifiers and loudspeakers that accept banana plugs must have plastic plugs in their sockets which can be manually removed by the user. The UK was included in the prohibition even though such mains sockets were not used there.

See also
 Binding post
 Gender of connectors and fasteners

Notes

References

External links
 What Size Banana Plug are you using?

DC power connectors
Electrical signal connectors